Here is a total list of songs by the Korean boy group EXO. As of May 2020, they have recorded 120 songs.

0-9

A

B

C

D

E

F

G

H

I

J

K

L

M

N

O

P

R

S

T

U

W

X

Y

References

Exo